El Salvador International Airport Saint Óscar Arnulfo Romero y Galdámez, previously known as Comalapa International Airport and also known as the Comalapa Air Base by the military, is a joint-use civilian and military airport that serves San Salvador, El Salvador. It is located in the south central area of the country, in the city of San Luis Talpa, Department of La Paz, and occupies a triangular plain of 2519.8 acres, which borders the Pacific Ocean to the south, to the east with the Jiboa River, and to the northwest with the coastal highway. Being close to sea level, it allows aircraft to operate efficiently at maximum capacity. It is connected to the capital of San Salvador, El Salvador through a modern four-lane motorway, with 42 kilometers (26 miles) travel in an average time of 30 minutes.

It is the third of Central America in movement of passengers with 3,411,015 annually, counted without methodology, suggested by International Civil Aviation Organization (ICAO). It is classified as category 1 by the Federal Aviation Administration of the United States (FAA) and is certified by the Civil Aviation Authority (CAA). Being the first in the isthmus to achieve these certifications In the Skytrax World Airport Awards 2015 it was recognized as the third best airport in Central America and the Caribbean. According to the World Economic Forum, it is the second in the region with the most competitive infrastructure achieving a score of 4.8 – 7.0 being the highest score – exceeded only by Panama (6.2). In addition, ICAO recognizes it as one of the airports with the best security standards in the continent, only exceeded by United States and Canada.

History 

The airport was built in the late 1970s to replace its predecessor, Ilopango International Airport, which is now used for regional, air taxi, military, and charter aviation. The airport was built on the initiative and request of the then President, Colonel Arturo Armando Molina. Funding for this project was provided through the Government of Japan, Engineering and building came under the direction of Hazama Ando (then Hazama Gumi). The electrical work for all lighting and communications was completed by Toshiba (then Tokyo Shibaura Electric). The Airport entered in operation on 31 January 1980 as Cuscatlán International Airport, with its first flight being a TACA airliner bound for Guatemala City.

In 1995, the Salvadoran company B&B Arquitectos Asociados designed the expansion of waiting rooms and boarding bridges, of which only the area located to the west was built. The airport is the only connection center in Central America, or hub, for the airline Avianca, and also serves other airlines that fly to almost 30 destinations between Central America, North America, South America and Europe. Since 1998 when the first expansion of the airport occurred (AIES II), the airport has been suffering from saturation in areas of check-in, screening, immigration and baggage as it continues to serve more than 2 million passengers arriving each year. In late 2012, the Autonomous Port Executive Commission (CEPA) began their rehabilitation, modernization and optimization project for the airport, which was completed in April 2015.

On 16 January 2014, El Salvador President Mauricio Funes announced in San Salvador's Presidential House the name of El Salvador International Airport after Monsignor Óscar Arnulfo Romero y Galdámez, but it is still commonly known as El Salvador International Airport. The Legislature of El Salvador approved the name change on 19 March 2014, without the vote of the Nationalist Republican Alliance (ARENA) or the National Coalition Party (PCN), to Monseñor Óscar Arnulfo Romero y Galdámez International Airport. On 24 March 2014, Funes unveiled a ceremonial plaque to mark the official renaming. The airport was renamed to Saint Óscar Arnulfo Romero y Galdámez International Airport on 29 October 2018 by the Commission of Culture and Education after Romero was canonized as a saint by the Catholic Church on 14 October of the same year.

Airport infrastructure 

 

Saint Óscar Arnulfo Romero y Galdámez International Airport serves as the main hub for TACA Airlines, now Avianca El Salvador, and Volaris El Salvador. The cargo terminal, located a few dozen meters west of the passenger terminal, handles millions of tons of cargo each year. Roads connect the airport with the city. It handles international flights to Central America, North America, South America and Europe including daily flights to Spain.

When the airport was built, it originally had only 7 gates. It was designed to handle around 400,000 passengers a year, but the high increase of passengers in the last 15 years brought the airport to its maximum capacity. The airport has had two main expansions in the last decade or so. In its first phase (named AIES I), the airport grew from 7 boarding gates to 12, and later the second phase, AIES II, added 5 more gates bringing the total to 17. Along with new gates, new expanded passenger waiting areas were built. Even though all these expansions have been made, the airport once again has reached the peak of its capacity, handling over 2 million passengers in 2006. In February 2022, a brand new terminal building was inaugurated with five gates and the first gate with double boarding jetways in the airport. The new terminal building segregates arriving passengers, connecting, and departing passengers.

Parallel to the main track and the same length as this, is the taxiway Alpha, which is connected to the track through six starts. For the use of small aircraft, there is also a secondary runway built (18/36), which is currently used for parking of "long life" for aircraft that require it.

The platform of Passenger Terminal 1 Building has fourteen aircraft parking positions with respective boarding bridges, which connect the aircraft directly to the waiting rooms. The platform of Passenger Terminal 2 Building has five aircraft parking positions with their respective boarding bridges. One of the positions has double boarding bridges for widebody aircraft. Three remaining positions are "remote", i.e., passengers who disembark at any of them are transferred to the terminal through aerobuses. The remote gates are used mostly by turboprop aircraft. The runway is capable of handling landings and takeoffs by Boeing 747 and Boeing 777 aircraft. Taiwan's President Tsai Ing-wen made an official diplomatic tour of Central America in an Eva Air B777-300ER aircraft.

The platform of the Cargo Terminal Building (ETC) has three positions for cargo aircraft parking, and also has a platform for the maintenance of five aircraft if required, just in front of hangars Aeromantenimiento (AEROMAN), a modern repairs workshop.

Facilities 

The airport's modern facilities include duty-free shops, fast food and full-service restaurants, bars, air conditioned areas, tourist facilities, car rental, and spacious waiting rooms. There is space for 14 airplanes in terminal 1, 5 airplanes in terminal 2, 3 in the cargo terminal, 37 in Aeromantenimiento, S.A., and around 20 in the "Long Term Parking" which is runway 18/36. 94.5% of the airport's flights are on time (2005 data). The airport and runway have been closed at least 10 times in the almost quarter century since opening. They were closed for several hours following the devastating earthquake of 2001, followed up with minor repairs to the east end of the runway. They were closed again for several hours in 2005 due to Hurricane Stan. Although the airport is located near the Pacific Ocean, storms and hurricanes are not frequent.

There is Wi-Fi availability throughout much of the airport via Tigo El Salvador. Near Gate 3, a café called "The Coffee Cup" has free Wi-Fi for all customers.

Shops & restaurants 

Airport passengers can make purchases from a wide range of duty-free shopping, including clothing, perfume, and spirits. There are also a variety of craft shops and restaurants. Other services include twelve car rental companies. Hotel chains such as Marriott International, Radisson, InterContinental, Hilton, Terrace, and Comfort offer representative and check-in desks at the airport.

Security 

The International Airport of El Salvador, located in the town of San Luis Talpa, La Paz, received an international certification from the Civil Aviation Authority (CAA), after an investment of $8 million and a process of four years and two extensions.

The document credits the Salvadorian airport terminal with compliance with all safety regulations issued under the Civil Aviation Organisation (ICAO), on fire control and health care, removal of rubber from the runways, lights and safety signs.

The certification enables El Salvador to keep the category 1 status from the Federal Aviation Administration of the United States. "From the start of operations of the airport in January 1980, the terminal has been characterized by its safety," said Ricardo Sauerbrey, head of the Salvadorian terminal.

Airlines and destinations 

 Iberia's flight from Madrid to San Salvador makes a stop in Guatemala City, but the airline does not have traffic rights to transport passengers solely between Guatemala City and San Salvador.

Cargo

Statistics

Busiest routes

Airline market share

Accidents and incidents 

Saint Óscar Arnulfo Romero y Galdámez International Airport hasn't had any fatalities or accidents, however, there has been one emergency landing from a flight passing near the airport.

In 2001, El Salvador experienced an earthquake (7.6 in the Richter scale). El Salvador International Airport (SAL) closed several hours due to airport damage, all damage was successfully repaired.
 November 2013, A Copa Airlines Flight from Los Angeles with destination to Panama City, Panama, had to perform an emergency landing at El Salvador International Airport due to technical problems.
On 29 December 2013, flights to/from Honduras and Nicaragua were suspended due to the eruption of the Chaparrastique Volcano (San Miguel Volcano), which caused an ash plume that had a 10 kilometers height. Flights to and from Honduras and Nicaragua resumed when it was safe to fly by and the Yellow and Orange Alerts were gone; by 5 January 2014 all flights were resumed.

See also 

Transport in El Salvador
List of airports in El Salvador

References

External links 

 Official website 

Airports in El Salvador
Airports established in 1980
San Salvador